Dottie Sutcliffe (born 27 August 1946) is a Rhodesian former swimmer. She competed in three events for Rhodesia at the 1960 Summer Olympics.

References

1946 births
Living people
Rhodesian female swimmers
Olympic swimmers of Rhodesia
Swimmers at the 1960 Summer Olympics
Commonwealth Games competitors for Rhodesia and Nyasaland
Swimmers at the 1962 British Empire and Commonwealth Games
Swimmers from Johannesburg
South African emigrants to Rhodesia
White Rhodesian people